Kidal is a town in Mali

Kidal may refer to:
 Kidal Region, a region in Mali
 Kidal temple, a Hindu temple built under the Singhasari kingdom, located in Malang, East Java, Indonesia